The Norwegian Bakery and Confectionery Workers' Union (NBKF) was a trade union representing workers in the baking trade in Norway.

The union was founded in 1893, on the initiative of Adolf Bay.  It later affiliated to the Norwegian Confederation of Trade Unions.  By 1924, it had 1,723 members, and by 1954, this had grown to 3,732.  In 1962, it merged into the Norwegian Union of Food, Beverage and Allied Workers.

References

Bakers' and confectioners' trade unions
Trade unions established in 1893
Trade unions disestablished in 1962
Trade unions in Norway